is a 2016 Japanese sports romantic teen drama film written and directed by  and starring Suzu Hirose, Shūhei Nomura, Mackenyu, Mone Kamishiraishi, Miyuki Matsuda and Jun Kunimura. It is the first of three live action film adaptations of the manga series Chihayafuru, written and illustrated by Yuki Suetsugu. The film was released in Japan by Toho on March 19, 2016. It was followed by Chihayafuru: Shimo no Ku, released in Japan on April 29, 2016. Chihayafuru: Musubi, the third and final film in the series, was released in Japan on March 17, 2018.

Plot

In elementary school, Chihaya Ayase forms a bond, through competitive karuta, with two of her Tokyo classmates; recent Fukui transfer student Arata Wataya and Taichi Mashima, her childhood friend. Arata is a prodigious karuta player whose dream is to become Meijin, the men's division karuta champion in Japan, equivalent to the women's division Queen title. He believes that Chihaya has the potential to become a great player. Inspired, Chihaya commits to a new dream, becoming Japan's best karuta player. Not content with only participating in their school's tournament, the trio team up and join a local karuta society. They are soon separated, at the end of primary school, when Arata moves back to Fukui while Taichi and Chihaya enrol in different middle schools. but not before promising each other to remain connected through karuta. In her first year in high school, karuta obsessed Chihaya is reunited with Taichi, when she is recruiting students to join her for karuta competitions. Together, they form the Mizusawa Karuta Club. Participation in tournaments enables them to reconnect with Arata. Unbeknownst to Chihaya, the two boys have fallen in love with her. With her teammates and friends supporting her, Chihaya continues to strive to become the best karuta player in the world, while forging relationships with other players.

Cast
Suzu Hirose as Chihaya Ayase
Shūhei Nomura as Taichi Mashima
Mackenyu as Arata Wataya
Mone Kamishiraishi as Kanade Ōe
 as Yūsei Nishida
 as Tsutomu Komano
 as Akihito Sudō
Mayu Matsuoka as Shinobu Wakamiya
Miyuki Matsuda as Taeko Miyauchi
Jun Kunimura as Harada Hideo
 as Hiro Kinashi
Alice Hirose as Chitose Ayase, Chihaya's sister (cameo)
Masane Tsukayama as Hajime Wataya

Production
The film was shot at the Omi Shrine in Shiga Prefecture. The theme song of the film is "FLASH" by the Japanese group Perfume. The original soundtracks are composed by Masaru Yokoyama.

Release
The release date of the film was announced in December 2015 for March 19, 2016.

Reception

Sequels
A sequel, titled Chihayafuru: Shimo no Ku, was released in Japan on April 29, 2016. Another sequel was announced at Chihayafuru: Shimo no Ku's premiere. This third and final film, titled Chihayafuru: Musubi, was released on March 17, 2018.

Awards

References

External links

2010s Japanese films
2010s teen drama films
Films directed by Norihiro Koizumi
Films set in Tokyo
Films set in Fukui Prefecture
Nippon TV films
Japanese high school films
Japanese teen drama films
Live-action films based on manga
Toho films
2016 drama films
2010s high school films